Billie Holiday at Jazz at the Philharmonic (MG C-169) is a live album by jazz singer Billie Holiday, originally recorded on February 12, 1945 and October 3, 1946 at the Jazz at the Philharmonic concert at the Shrine Auditorium in Los Angeles, and at Carnegie Hall on June 3, 1946.

Content

Jazz at the Philharmonic, or JATP, was the title of a series of jazz concerts, tours and recordings produced by Norman Granz from 1944 through 1983. Billie Holiday would go on to perform at Jazz at the Philharmonic concerts numerous times, even joining the troupe in 1954.

The liner notes on the original LP quote a review from Down Beat, praising the album:
"These were recorded at a JATP concert in LA in 1946, and never again will Billie sound this wonderful. The years that have passed since then have taken their toll on the great stylist, but this all happened on a night when she had everything, and you don't find this LP to be one of the most emotional half-hours you've ever spent, there's something wrong. (...) Certainly one of the outstanding records in years."

Billie Holiday at Jazz at the Philharmonic was originally released as a 10 inch LP in 1954, her fourth LP for Norman Granz's Clef  label. After the 10 inch form was discontinued, the 8 tracks would be rereleased as parts of various compilations.

Track listing

Side one
 "Body and Soul" (Edward Heyman, Robert Sour, Frank Eyton, Johnny Green) - 3:24
 "Strange Fruit" (Abel Meeropol as Lewis Allan) - 3:01
 "Trav'lin' Light (Trummy Young, Jimmy Mundy, Johnny Mercer) - 3:28
 "He's Funny That Way" (Richard Whiting, Neil Moret) - 2:56

Side two
 "The Man I Love" (George Gershwin, Ira Gershwin) - 3:04
 "Gee, Baby, Ain't I Good to You" (Andy Razaf, Don Redman) - 2:19
 "All of Me" (Gerald Marks, Seymour Simons) - 1:55
 "Billie's Blues (Billie Holiday) - 3:39

Personnel

February 12, 1945 (Tracks 1 & 2)
Billie Holiday, vocals
Lester Young, tenor sax
Illinois Jacquet, tenor sax
George Auld, alto sax
Buck Clayton, trumpet
Ken Kersey, piano
Tiny Grimes, guitar
JC Heard, drums 
Al McKibbon, bass

October 7, 1946 (Tracks 3 & 4)
Billie Holiday, vocals
Illinois Jacquet, tenor sax
Trummy Young, trombone
Howard McGhee, trumpet
Ken Kersey, piano
Barney Kessel, guitar
Jack Mills, drums
Charlie Drayton, bass

June 3, 1946 (Tracks 5-8)
same as February 12, 1945 personnel.

References

Billie Holiday albums
1954 live albums
Clef Records live albums
Verve Records live albums
Albums produced by Norman Granz
Albums recorded at Carnegie Hall
Live vocal jazz albums